Morindin is an anthraquinone glycoside present in several Morinda species, especially M. tinctoria (the Indian mulberry tree) and M. citrifolia (noni). Chemical or enzymatic hydrolysis of morindin yields its bright red aglycone, morindone.

The structure and formula of morindin were first elucidated by Thomas Edward Thorpe and T. H. Greenall in 1887.

References 

Anthraquinone dyes
Anthraquinone glycosides
Natural dyes
Trihydroxyanthraquinones